Streptomyces koyangensis is a bacterium species from the genus of Streptomyces which has been isolated from radish soil in Koyang in Korea. Streptomyces koyangensis produces antifungal 4-phenyl-3-butenoic acid.

See also 
 List of Streptomyces species

References

Further reading

External links
Type strain of Streptomyces koyangensis at BacDive -  the Bacterial Diversity Metadatabase

koyangensis
Bacteria described in 2005